The women's triple jump event at the 2013 Summer Universiade was held on 9–10 July.

Medalists

Results

Qualification
Qualification: 13.90 m (Q) or at least 12 best (q) qualified for the final.

Final

References 

Triple
2013 in women's athletics
2013